The Prussian Class T 14.1 was a German 2-8-2T, goods train, tank locomotive operated by the Prussian state railways and the Royal Württemberg State Railways. They were later incorporated by the Deutsche Reichsbahn into the DRG renumbering plan for steam locomotives as DRG Class 93.5–12.

Compared with the Prussian T 14 the axle load on the trailing wheels of the T 14.1 was initially 187.3 kN higher than that of the driving wheels. Later this was able to be reduced to 170,6 kN. The water tanks and coal bunkers were larger, so that more water and coal could be carried. Through changes in the running gear, the top speed could be increased to 70 km/h.

Because many engines had been lost due to break downs or World War I reparations, the Württemberg State Railway procured these locomotives initially for the lines from Esslingen am Neckar via Stuttgart to Ludwigsburg. They were based on the Prussian T 14.1 and differed only in a few details from their prototype.

In all 729 vehicles were procured between 1918 and 1924 for the Prussian state railways and the Prussian railway divisions of the Deutsche Reichsbahn. The Royal Württemberg State Railways and the DRG's Stuttgart division bought 39 engines between 1921 and 1922. They were given numbers 93 501 - 1261, of which 93 795–814 and 832–850  were former Württemberg machines.

The Deutsche Bundesbahn retired the last T 14.1, designated in 1968 as Class 093, that same year. In the Deutsche Reichsbahn (GDR) the engines, which had been designated in 1970 as 93.1–6, were withdrawn by 1972.

The only existing example, number 93 526, is to be found in the German Steam Locomotive Museum at Neuenmarkt-Wirsberg and is currently being restored there.

See also 
 Prussian state railways
 List of Prussian locomotives and railcars

References

External links

 DDM – Deutsches Dampflokmotiv-Museum, Neuenmarkt-Wirsberg

2-8-2T locomotives
T 14.1
Freight locomotives
Standard gauge locomotives of Germany
Railway locomotives introduced in 1918
Hohenzollern locomotives
Esslingen locomotives
Hanomag locomotives
Henschel locomotives
Berliner locomotives
Krupp locomotives
1′D1′ h2t locomotives
Schichau-Werke locomotives
Union Giesserei locomotives